Harold Cummins M.D. (May 28, 1893 – May 12, 1976) was an anatomist and dermatoglyphics specialist. He is considered to be the founder of dermatoglyphics.

Early life and education
A native of Markleville, Indiana, Cummins attended the University of Michigan, receiving his BA in 1916. While attending the University of Michigan, he was inducted into two academic honor societies: Sigma Xi and Phi Beta Kappa.  Cummins completed his PhD in anatomy at Tulane University in 1925.

Career
In his multiple positions as an educator, Cummins taught over 5000 students. Cummins worked at Vanderbilt University as a Histology instructor (1916-1917) and as an assistant professor of Microscopic Anatomy from 1917 through 1919. In 1919, Cummins joined the faculty at Tulane University where he remained for the rest of his educational career, nearly five decades, serving in a variety of positions. His positions at Tulane University included:
Chairman of the Department of Anatomy (1933–1960)
Chairman of the Department of Microscopic Anatomy (1933–1945)
Assistant dean at Tulane University School of Medicine (1949-1964)
Chair of Tulane University School of Medicine admissions (1949-1964)
Professor emeritus of Anatomy (1964)

Cummins also held positions at a number of journals and associated organizations including:
American Journal of Human Genetics editorial board (Advisory editorial committee) (1949-1955)
Vice President of the American Society of Human Genetics (1955)
President of the American Association of Anatomists (1961-1962)

In 1926, Cummins coined the term dermatoglyphics.

Professional affiliations
American Association of Physical Anthropologists
International Association for Identification
Society for Experimental Biology and Medicine
American Association for the Advancement of Science
Louisiana State Medical Society (honorary member)

Selected publications

See also
:Category:Taxa named by Harold Cummins

References

1893 births
1976 deaths
American scientists
University of Michigan alumni